John Magufuli became president of Tanzania on 5 November 2015 following the 2015 general election, until his death in 2021. After assuming office Magufuli asserted a strong stance against public spending, and discouraged foreign travel by senior government officials. He made his first foreign visit to Rwanda in April 2016, five months after assuming office. The following is a list of presidential trips made by John Magufuli while in office.

Summary of international trips

2016 
The following international trips were made by John Magufuli in 2016

2017 
The following international trips were made by John Magufuli in 2017

2018 
The following international trips were made by John Magufuli in 2018

2019 
The following international trips were made by John Magufuli in 2019

References 

John Magufuli
2016 in international relations
Magufuli, John
Magufuli, John
 
Magufuli, John
Magufuli